The Staffordshire County League was an English football competition based in the county of Staffordshire.  It existed from at least 1957 until 2005, when it merged with the Midland League to form the new Staffordshire County Senior League, with the former County League teams forming Divisions One and Two of the new league, at levels 12 and 13 of the English football league system.

Champions
The champion clubs from 1989 until the league's discontinuation were as follows:

1989–90 – Stallington         
1990–91 – Stallington         
1991–92 – Foley           
1992–93 – Cheadle Rovers      
1993–94 – Florence            
1994–95 – Wolstanton United   
1995–96 – Foley   
1996–97 – Alsager College     
1997–98 – Abbey Hulton United
1998–99 – Vale Juniors        
1999–2000 – Eccleshall          
2000–01 – Chesterton          
2001–02 – Stallington         
2002–03 – Eccleshall
2003–04 – Holditch Miners     
2004–05 – Fegg Hayes

References

 
Football in Staffordshire
Defunct football leagues in England